Palaeostylidae is an extinct family of fossil sea snails, marine gastropod mollusks in the clade Caenogastropoda.

References

 The Taxonomicon

Prehistoric gastropods